The Men's team time trial of the 2017 UCI Road World Championships was a cycling event that took place on 17 September 2017 in Bergen, Norway. It was the 33rd edition of the championship, and the 6th since its reintroduction for trade teams in 2012. Belgian team  were the defending champions, having won in 2016. 17 teams and 102 riders entered the competition.

Defending champions  finished fourth, 35.20 seconds down on the winners, and missed the medals for the first time since the race was reintroduced.

Course
The race started at Askøy and finished in the centre of Bergen. It was -long and featured two climbs: Loddefjord, a -long climb at an average gradient of 10% and the Birkelundsbakken, a climb  in length, at an average of 6%.

Prevention of UCI WorldTeams boycott
Just as in 2016, the event had been due to award points towards the team rankings of the 2017 UCI World Tour. In August 2017, the Association International des Groupes Cyclistes Professionels (AIGCP) agreed a deal with the UCI to avoid a boycott of the race, but no points would be awarded towards the World Tour rankings.

Final classification
All seventeen teams completed the -long course.

References

External links
Team time trial page at Bergen 2017 website

Men's team time trial
UCI Road World Championships – Men's team time trial
2017 in men's road cycling